Incred Finance is a private NFI (NBFC) in India. The company focuses on Consumer Loans - Personal Loan, Educations Loans and SME Business Loans. It is headquartered in Mumbai, Maharashtra. It was founded by Bhupinder Singh, ex-head of the Corporate Finance division of Deutsche Bank. 

Former Co-CEO of Deutsche Bank, Anshu Jain, joined the Advisory Board of the company. Other members on the board include M D Mallya (former Chairman, Bank of Baroda).

Incred Finance acquired FinTech platform InstaPaisa.com in 2015.

Funding
Incred Finance received an initial round of funding of ₹500–600 Crore from Ranjan Pai (MD & CEO, Manipal Group), Gaurav Dalmia (Founder & Chairman, Landmark Holdings), IDFC PE, and Alpha Capital. Paragon Partners, a private equity firm, invested ₹25 Crore in the company in March 2017.

In 2020 the company secured ₹500 crore in a debt funding round from public sector banks and other financial institutions.

References 

Financial services companies based in Mumbai
2017 establishments in Maharashtra
Financial services companies established in 2017
Indian companies established in 2017